The Runaway Scrape events took place mainly between September 1835 and April 1836 and were the evacuations by Texas residents fleeing the Mexican Army of Operations during the Texas Revolution, from the Battle of the Alamo through the decisive Battle of San Jacinto. The ad interim government of the new Republic of Texas and much of the civilian population fled eastward ahead of the Mexican forces. The conflict arose after Antonio López de Santa Anna abrogated the 1824 Constitution of Mexico and established martial law in Coahuila y Tejas. The Texians resisted and declared their independence. It was Sam Houston's responsibility, as the appointed commander-in-chief of the Provisional Army of Texas (before such an army actually existed), to recruit and train a military force to defend the population against troops led by Santa Anna.

Residents on the Gulf Coast and at San Antonio de Béxar began evacuating in January upon learning of the Mexican army's troop movements into their area, an event that was ultimately replayed across Texas. During early skirmishes, some Texian soldiers surrendered, believing that they would become prisoners of war — but Santa Anna demanded their executions. The news of the Battle of the Alamo and the Goliad massacre instilled fear in the population and resulted in the mass exodus of the civilian population of Gonzales, where the opening battle of the Texian revolution had begun and where, only days before the fall of the Alamo, they had sent a militia to reinforce the defenders at the mission. The civilian refugees were accompanied by the newly forming provisional army, as Houston bought time to train soldiers and create a military structure that could oppose Santa Anna's greater forces. Houston's actions were viewed as cowardice by the ad interim government, as well as by some of his own troops. As he and the refugees from Gonzales escaped first to the Colorado River and then to the Brazos, evacuees from other areas trickled in and new militia groups arrived to join with Houston's force.

The towns of Gonzales, Beason’s Crossing (present day Columbus) and San Felipe de Austin were burned to keep them out of the hands of the Mexican army. Santa Anna was intent on executing members of the Republic's interim government, who fled from Washington-on-the-Brazos to Groce's Landing to Harrisburgh and New Washington. The government officials eventually escaped to Galveston Island, and Santa Anna burned the towns of Harrisburgh and New Washington when he failed to find them. Approximately 5,000 terrified residents of New Washington fled from the Mexican army. After a little over a month of training the troops, Houston reached a crossroads where he ordered some of them to escort the fleeing refugees farther east while he took the main army southeast to engage the Mexican army. The subsequent Battle of San Jacinto resulted in the surrender of Santa Anna and the signing of the Treaties of Velasco.

Prelude

Changes in Mexico: 1834 – 1835

In 1834, Mexican President Antonio López de Santa Anna shifted from a federalist political ideology to creating a centralist government and revoked the country's constitution of 1824. That constitution had established Coahuila y Tejas as a new Mexican state and had provided for each state in Mexico to create its own local-level constitution. After eliminating state-level governments, Santa Anna had in effect created a dictatorship, and he put Coahuila y Tejas under the military rule of General Martín Perfecto de Cos. When Santa Anna made Miguel Barragán temporary president, he also had Barragán install him as head of the Mexican Army of Operations.  Intending to put down all rebellion in Coahuila y Tejas, he began amassing his army on November 28, 1835,  soon followed by General Joaquín Ramírez y Sesma leading the Vanguard of the Advance across the Rio Grande in December.

Temporary governments in Texas: November 1835 – March 1836

Stephen F. Austin was commander of the existing unpaid volunteer Texian army, and at his urging the Consultation of 1835 convened in San Felipe de Austin on November 3 of that year. Their creation of a provisional government based on the 1824 constitution established the General Council as a legislative body with each municipality allotted one representative. Henry Smith was elected governor without any clearly defined powers of the position. Sam Houston was in attendance as the elected representative from Nacogdoches, who also served as commander of the Nacogdoches militia.  Edward Burleson replaced Austin as commander of the volunteer army on December 1.

On December 10, the General Council called new elections to choose delegates to determine the fate of the region. The Consultation approved the creation of the Provisional Army of Texas, a paid force of 2,500 troops. Houston was named commander-in-chief of the new army and issued a recruitment proclamation on December 12.
The volunteer army under Burleson disbanded on December 20. 

Harrisburgh was designated the seat of a deeply divided provisional government on December 30. Most of the General Council wanted to remain part of Mexico, but with the restoration of the 1824 constitution.  Governor Smith supported the opposing faction who advocated for complete independence. Smith dissolved the General Council on January 10, 1836, but it was unclear if he had the power to do that. He was impeached on January 11. The power struggle effectively shut down the government.

The Convention of 1836 met at Washington-on-the-Brazos on March 1. The following day, the 59 delegates created the Republic of Texas by affixing their signatures to the Texas Declaration of Independence. Houston's military authority was expanded on March 4 to include "the land forces of the Texian army both Regular, Volunteer, and Militia." The delegates elected the Republic's ad interim government on March 16, with David G. Burnet as president, Lorenzo de Zavala as vice president, Samuel P. Carson as secretary of state, Thomas Jefferson Rusk as secretary of war, Bailey Hardeman as secretary of the treasury, Robert Potter as secretary of the navy, and David Thomas as attorney general.

Battle of Gonzales: October 2, 1835

The Battle of Gonzales was the onset of a chain of events that led to what is known as the Runaway Scrape.  The confrontation began in September 1835, when the Mexican government attempted to reclaim a bronze cannon that it had provided to Gonzales in 1831 to protect the town against Indian attacks. The first attempt by Corporal Casimiro De León resulted in De León's detachment being taken prisoners, and the cannon being buried in a peach orchard. James C. Neill, a veteran who had served at the Battle of Horseshoe Bend under Andrew Jackson, was put in charge of the artillery after it was later dug up and wheel mounted. When Lieutenant Francisco de Castañeda arrived accompanied by 100 soldiers and made a second attempt at repossessing the cannon, Texians dared the Mexicans to "come and take it". John Henry Moore led 150 Texian militia on October 2 in successfully repelling the Mexican troops. A "Come and Take It" flag was later fashioned by the women of Gonzales. The cannon was moved to San Antonio de Béxar and became one of the artillery pieces used by the defenders of the Alamo.

The immediate result of the Texian victory at Gonzales was that two days later the number of volunteers had swelled to over 300, and they were determined to drive the Mexican army out of Texas. Simultaneously, a company of volunteers under George M. Collinsworth captured the Presidio La Bahía from the Mexicans on October 9 at the Battle of Goliad. The Mexican government's response to the unrest in Texas was an October 30 authorization of war. On the banks of the Nueces River  from San Patricio on November 4 during the Battle of Lipantitlán, volunteers under Ira Westover captured the fort from Mexican troops.

Béxar: 1835–1836

Siege of Béxar and its aftermath: October 1835 – February 1836

By October 9, Cos had taken over San Antonio de Béxar. Stephen F. Austin sent an advance scout troop of 90 men under James Bowie and James Fannin to observe the Mexican forces. While taking refuge at Mission Concepción on October 28, they repelled an attack by 275 Mexicans under Domingo Ugartechea. Austin continued to send troops to Béxar. Bowie was ordered on November 26 to attack a Mexican supply train allegedly carrying a payroll. The resulting skirmish became known as the Grass Fight, after it was discovered that the only cargo was grass to feed the horses. When Austin was selected to join Branch T. Archer and William H. Wharton on a diplomatic mission to seek international recognition and support, Edward Burleson was named as commander. On December 5, James C. Neill began distracting Cos by firing artillery directly at the Alamo, while Benjamin Milam and Frank W. Johnson led several hundred volunteers in a surprise attack.  The fighting at the siege of Béxar continued until December 9 when Cos sent word he wanted to surrender. Cos and his men were sent back to Mexico but later united with Santa Anna's forces.

Approximately 300 of the Texian garrison at Béxar departed on December 30 to join Johnson and James Grant on the Matamoros Expedition, in a planned attack to seize the port for its financial resources. Proponents of this campaign were hoping Mexican Federalists would oust Santa Anna and restore the 1824 constitution. When Sesma crossed the Rio Grande, residents of the Gulf Coast began fleeing the area in January 1836. On February 16, Santa Anna ordered General José de Urrea to secure the Gulf Coast. In the skirmish, 16 Texians were killed, 6 escaped, and 21 were taken prisoner. Five of the men escaped the Battle of Agua Dulce and joined Fannin who wanted to increase the defense force at Goliad.

The Alamo: February 1836

Neill was promoted to lieutenant colonel during his participation in the siege of Béxar, and 10 days later Houston placed him in charge of the Texian garrison in the city. In January residents had begun evacuating ahead of Santa Anna's approaching forces. Neill pleaded with Houston for replenishment of troops, supplies and weaponry. The departure of Texians who joined the Matamoros Expedition had left Neill with only about 100 men. At that point Houston viewed Béxar as a military liability and did not want Santa Anna's advancing army gaining control of any remaining soldiers or artillery. He dispatched Bowie with instructions to remove the artillery, have the defenders abandon the Alamo mission and destroy it. Upon his January 19 arrival and subsequent discussions with Neill, Bowie decided the mission was the right place to stop the Mexican army in its tracks.  He stayed and began to help Neill prepare for the coming attack.  Lieutenant Colonel William B. Travis arrived with reinforcements on February 3. When Neill was given leave to attend to family matters on February 11, Travis assumed command of the mission, and three days later he and Bowie agreed to a joint command. Santa Anna crossed the Rio Grande on February 16, and the Mexican army's assault on the Alamo began February 23. Captain Juan Seguín left the mission on February 25, carrying a letter from Travis to Fannin at Goliad requesting more reinforcements. Santa Anna extended an offer of amnesty to Tejanos inside the fortress; a non-combatant survivor, Enrique Esparza, said that most Tejanos left when Bowie advised them to take the offer. In response to Travis' February 24 letter To the People of Texas, 32 militia volunteers formed the Gonzales Ranging Company of Mounted Volunteers and arrived at the Alamo on February 29.

Fall of the Alamo, and the runaway flight: March – April 1836

Houston begins forming his army

As the closest settlement to San Antonio de Béxar, Gonzales was the rallying point for volunteers who responded to both the Travis letter from the Alamo and Houston's recruitment pleas.  Recently formed groups came from Austin and Washington counties and from the Colorado River area. Volunteers from Brazoria, Fort Bend and Matagorda counties organized after arriving in Gonzales. The Kentucky Rifle company under Newport, Kentucky, business man Sidney Sherman had been aided by funding from Cincinnati, Ohio, residents.

Alamo commandant Neill was in Gonzales purchasing supplies and recruiting reinforcements on March 6, unaware that the Alamo had fallen to Mexican forces that morning.  When Seguin learned en route that Fannin would be unable to reach the Alamo in time, he immediately began mustering an all-Tejano company of scouts. His men combined with Lieutenant William Smith's and volunteered to accompany Neill's recruits. They encountered the Mexican army  from the Alamo on March 7, and Neill's men turned back while the Seguin-Smith scouts moved forward. As the scouts neared the Alamo, they heard only silence. Andrew Barcena and Anselmo Bergara from Seguin's other detachment inside the Alamo showed up in Gonzales on March 11, telling of their escape and delivering news of the March 6 slaughter. Their stories were discounted; Houston, who had arrived that same day, denounced them as Mexican spies.

Smith and Seguin confirmed the fate of the Alamo upon their return. Houston dispatched orders to Fannin to abandon Goliad, blow up the Presidio La Bahía fortress, and retreat to Victoria, but Fannin delayed acting on those orders. Believing the approach of Urrea's troops brought a greater urgency to local civilians, he sent 29 men under Captain Amon B. King to help evacuate nearby Refugio.

Houston promptly began organizing the troops at Gonzales into the First Regiment under Burleson who had arrived as part of the Mina volunteers. A second regiment would later be formed when the army grew large enough. As others began to arrive, individual volunteers not already in another company were put under Captain William Hestor Patton. Houston had 374 volunteers and their commanders in Gonzales on March 12.

Santa Anna sent Susanna Dickinson with her infant daughter Angelina, Travis' slave Joe, and Mexican Colonel Juan Almonte's cook Ben to Gonzales, with dispatches written in English by Almonte to spread the news of the fall of the Alamo. Scouts Deaf Smith, Henry Karnes and Robert Eden Handy encountered the survivors  outside of Gonzales on March 13.  When Karnes returned with the news, 25 volunteers deserted. Wailing filled the air when Dickinson and the others reached the town with their first-hand accounts.

Although civilian evacuations had begun in January for the Gulf Coast and San Antonio de Béxar, the Texian military was either on the offensive or standing firm until the smaller Gulf Coast skirmishes happened in February. Houston was now facing a choice of whether to retreat to a safe place to train his new army, or to meet the enemy head-on immediately. He was wary of trying to defend a fixed position – the debacle at the Alamo had shown that the new Texian government was unable to provide sufficient provisions or reinforcements.

Burning of Gonzales

Houston called for a council of war.  The officers voted that the families should be ordered to leave, and the troops would cover the retreat. By midnight, less than an hour after Dickinson had arrived, the combined army and civilian population began a frantic move eastward, leaving behind everything they could not immediately grab and transport. Much of the provisions and artillery were left behind, including two 24-pounder cannon. Houston ordered Salvador Flores along with a company of Juan Seguin's men to form the rear guard to protect the fleeing families.  Couriers were sent to other towns in Texas to warn that the Mexican army was advancing.

The retreat took place so quickly that many of the Texian scouts did not fully comprehend it until after the town was evacuated.  Houston ordered Karnes to burn the town and everything in it so nothing would remain to benefit the Mexican troops.  By dawn, the entire town was in ashes or flames.

Told of the Alamo's fall, Bird's men offered assistance to the fleeing citizens and joined Houston's army at Bartholomew D. McClure's plantation on the evening of March 14.

At Washington-on-the-Brazos, the delegates to the convention learned of the Alamo's fall on March 13. The Republic's new ad interim government was sworn in on March 17, with a department overseeing military spy operations, and adjourned the same day. The government then fled to Groce's Landing where they stayed for several days before moving on to Harrisburgh on March 21, where they established temporary headquarters in the home of widow Jane Birdsall Harris.

King's men at Refugio had taken refuge in Mission Nuestra Señora de la Rosario when they were subsequently attacked by Urrea's forces.  Fannin sent 120 reinforcements under William Ward, but the March 14 Battle of Refugio cost 15 Texian lives.  Ward's men escaped, but King's men were captured and executed on March 16.

Colorado River crossings
Upon learning of the flight, Santa Anna sent General Joaquín Ramírez y Sesma with 700 men to pursue Houston, and 600 men under General Eugenio Tolsa as reinforcements.  Finding only burned remains at Gonzales, Sesma marched his army toward the Colorado River.

The Texian army camped March 15–18 on the Lavaca River property of Williamson Daniels where they were joined by combined forces under Joe Bennett and Captain Peyton R. Splane. Fleeing civilians accompanied Houston's army turning north at the Navidad River as they crossed to the east side of the Colorado River at Burnam's Crossing. The ferry and trading post, as well as the family home of Jesse Burnam, were all burned at Houston's orders on March 17 to prevent Santa Anna's army from making the same crossing.

Beason's Crossing was located where Columbus is today. From March 19 through March 26, Houston split his forces between the two crossings. Additional Texian volunteer companies began arriving at both crossings, including three companies of Texas Rangers,  the Liberty County Volunteers and the Nacogdoches Volunteers.

Sesma's battalion of approximately 725 men and artillery camped on the opposite side of the Colorado, at a distance halfway between the two Texian camps. To prevent Sesma's troops from using William DeWees' log cabin, Sherman ordered it burned. Three Mexican scouts from Sesma's army were captured by Sherman's men, and although Sherman argued for an attack on Sesma's troops, Houston was not ready.

Fannin had begun evacuating Presidio La Bahía on March 19. The estimated 320 troops were low on food and water, and the breakdown of a wagon allowed Urrea's men to overtake them at Coleto Creek, ending in Fannin's surrender on March 20. Peter Kerr, who had served with Fannin and claimed to have been held prisoner, arrived at DeWees Crossing on March 25. Houston announced Fannin's surrender but would later claim to have uncovered evidence that Kerr was a spy for the Mexicans.

The Texian army was a force of 810 volunteers and staff at this point, but few had any military training and experience. Faced with past desertions, discipline flaws, and individual indecisiveness of volunteers in training, Houston knew they were not yet ready to engage the Mexican army. Compounding the situation were the civilian refugees dependent upon the army for their protection. The news of Fannin's capture, combined with his doubts about the readiness of the Texian army, led Houston to order a retreat on March 26. Some of the troops viewed the decision as cowardice with Sesma sitting just on the other side of the Colorado, and several hundred men deserted.

Brazos River training camp

Groce's Landing 
Texian survivors of the Battle of Coleto Creek believed their surrender agreement with Urrea would, at worst, mean their deportation. Santa Anna, however, adhered to the 1835 Tornel Decree that stated the insurrection was an act of piracy fomented by the United States and ordered their executions. Although he personally disagreed with the need to do so, Urrea carried out his commander's orders on March 27. Of the estimated 370 Texians being held, a few managed to escape the massacre at Goliad. The remainder were shot, stabbed with bayonets and lances and clubbed with gun butts. Fannin was shot through the face and his gold watch stolen. The dead were cremated on a pyre.

The retreating Texian army stopped at San Felipe de Austin on March 28–29 to stock up on food and supplies. Houston's plan to move the army north to Groce's Landing on the Brazos River was met with resistance from captains Wyly Martin and Moseley Baker, whose units balked at further retreat.

News of approaching Mexican troops and Houston's retreat caused panic among the population in the counties of Washington, Sabine, Shelby and San Augustine. Amid the confusion of fleeing residents of those counties, two volunteer groups under captains William Kimbro and Benjamin Bryant arrived to join Houston on March 29. Kimbro was ordered to San Felipe de Austin to reinforce Baker's troops, while Bryant's men remained with the main army.

After an erroneous scouting report of approaching Mexican troops, Baker burned San Felipe de Austin to the ground on March 30. When Baker claimed Houston had given him an order to do so, Houston denied it. Houston's account was that the residents burned their own property to keep it out of the hands of the Mexican army. San Felipe de Austin's residents fled to the east.

During a two-week period beginning March 31, the Texian army camped on the west side of the Brazos River in Austin County, near Groce's Landing (also known as Groce's Ferry). As Houston led his army north towards the landing, the unrelenting rainy weather swelled the Brazos and threatened flooding. Groce's Landing was transformed into a training camp for the troops. Major Edwin Morehouse arrived with a New York battalion of recruits who were immediately assigned to assist Wyly Martin at Fort Bend. Civilian men who were fleeing the Mexicans enlisted, and displaced civilian women in the camp helped the army's efforts by sewing shirts for the soldiers.

Samuel G. Hardaway, a survivor of Major William Ward's group who had escaped the Battle of Refugio and re-joined Fannin at the Battle of Coleto, also managed to escape the Goliad massacre. As he fled Goliad, he was eventually joined by three other survivors, Joseph Andrews, James P. Trezevant and M. K. Moses. Spies for the Texian army discovered the four men and took them to Baker's camp near San Felipe de Austin on April 2. Several other survivors of the Goliad massacre were found on April 10 by Texian spies. Survivors Daniel Murphy, Thomas Kemp, Charles Shain, David Jones, William Brenan and Nat Hazen were taken to Houston at Groce's Landing where they enlisted to fight with Houston's army.

Houston learned of the Goliad massacre on April 3. Unaware that Secretary of War Rusk was already en route to Groce's Landing with orders from President Burnet to halt the army's retreat and engage the enemy, he relayed the Goliad news by letter to Rusk.

Empowered to remove Houston from command and take over the army himself, Rusk instead assessed Houston's plan of action as correct, after witnessing the training taking place at Groce's Landing. Rusk and Houston formed the Second Regiment on April 8 to serve under Sherman, with Burleson retaining command of the First Regiment.

Yellowstone steamboat
The steamboat Yellowstone under the command of Captain John Eautaw Ross was impressed into service for the Provisional Army of Texas on April 2 and initially ferried patients across the Brazos River when Dr. James Aeneas Phelps established a field hospital at Bernardo Plantation. Three days later, Santa Anna joined with Sesma's troops and had them build flatboats to cross the Brazos as the Mexicans sought to overtake and defeat the Texians. Wyly Martin reported on April 8 that Mexican forces had divided and were headed both east to Nacogdoches and southeast to Matagorda. Houston reinforced Baker's post at San Felipe de Austin on April 9, as Santa Anna continued moving southeast on April 10.

The Texian army was transported by the Yellowstone over to the east side of the Brazos on April 12, where they set up camp at the Bernardo Plantation. After walking  from Harrisburgh, Mirabeau B. Lamar arrived at Bernardo to enlist as a private in Houston's army and suggested using the steamer for guerilla warfare.

With Baker guarding the crossing at San Felipe de Austin, and Martin guarding the Morton Ferry crossing at Ford Bend, Santa Anna opted on April 12 to cross the Brazos halfway between at Thompson's Ferry, with Sesma's men and artillery crossing over the next day. The Mexican army attacked the steamer numerous times in an attempt to capture it, but Ross successfully used cotton bales to protect the steamer and its cargo and was able to keep the Yellowstone away from Mexican control. Houston released the steamboat from service on April 14, and it sailed on to Galveston.

Burning of Harrisburgh and the crucial crossroads

The ad interim government departed Harrisburgh on the steamboat Cayuga for New Washington ahead of Santa Anna's April 15 arrival, thwarting his plans to eliminate the entire government of the Republic of Texas. Three printers still at work on the Telegraph and Texas Register told the Mexican army that everyone in the government had already left, and  Santa Anna responded by having the printers arrested and the printing presses tossed into Buffalo Bayou. After days of looting and seeking out information about the government, Santa Anna ordered the town burned on April 18. He later tried to place the blame for the destruction on Houston.

Before the Texian army left Bernardo Plantation, they welcomed the arrival of two cannon cast in Cincinnati, Ohio, funded entirely by the people of that city as a donation to the Texas Revolution. The idea had arisen as a suggestion from Robert F. Lytle, one of the businessmen who helped fund Sherman's Kentucky Riflemen. Arriving in New Orleans after a lengthy trip from Ohio on the Mississippi River, the cannon were transported to the Gulf Coast aboard the Pennsylvania schooner. The cannons were nicknamed the "Twin Sisters", perhaps in honor of the twins Elizabeth and Eleanor Rice traveling aboard the Pennsylvania, who were to present the cannon upon their arrival at Galveston in April 1836. At Galveston, Leander Smith had the responsibility of transporting the cannon from Harrisburgh to Bernardo Plantation. Along the way, Smith recruited 35 men into the army. Lieutenant Colonel James Neill was put in charge of the cannon once they arrived in camp.

Martin and Baker abandoned the river crossings on April 14 and re-joined Houston's army which had marched from Bernardo to the Charles Donoho Plantation near present-day Hempstead in Waller County. As news spread of the Mexican army's movements, residents of Nacogdoches and San Augustine began to flee east towards the Sabine River.  After refusals to continue with the army, Martin was ordered by Houston to accompany displaced families on their flight eastward. Hundreds of soldiers left the army to help their families. The main army parted from the refugees at this point, and acting Secretary of War David Thomas advised Houston to move southward to secure Galveston Bay. Houston, however, was getting conflicting advice from the cabinet members. President Burnet had sent Secretary of State Carson to Louisiana in hopes of getting the United States army and individual state militias involved in the Texas fight for independence. While he attempted to secure such involvement, Carson sent a dispatch to Houston on April 14 advising him to retreat all the way to the Louisiana-Texas border on the Sabine River and bide his time before engaging the Mexican army.

The Texian army camped west of present-day Tomball on April 15, at Sam McCarley's homestead. One road led east to Nacogdoches and eventually the Sabine River and Louisiana, while the other road led southeast to Harrisburgh. The army was concerned that Houston would continue the eastward retreat. Although Houston discussed his decision with no one, he led the army down the southeast road. Rusk ordered that a small group of volunteers be split from the army to secure Robbins's Ferry on the Trinity River.

With the refugee families being accorded a military escort eastward and Houston marching southeast, the retreat of the Provisional Army of Texas was over.  On the march which would lead to San Jacinto, moving the heavy artillery across rain-soaked terrain slowed the army's progress. The army had previously been assisted in moving the Twin Sisters with oxen borrowed from refugee Pamela Mann when she believed the army was fleeing towards Nacogdoches. When she learned the army was headed towards Harrisburgh and a confrontation with the Mexican army, she reclaimed her oxen. The Texian army had expanded to 26 companies by the time they reached Harrisburgh on April 18 and saw the destruction Santa Anna had left behind.

New Washington

On orders of Santa Anna after the burning of Harrisburgh, Almonte went in pursuit of the ad interim government at New Washington.  During their flight the Republic officials switched from steamer to ferry to skiff. On the final leg of the trip, Almonte finally had them in his sights but refused to fire after he saw Mrs. Burnet and her children on the skiff. In addition to letting the government get away one more time, Almonte's spies had misread Houston's troop movements, and Santa Anna was told that the Texian army was still retreating eastward, this time through Lynchburg.

New Washington was looted and burned on April 20 by Mexican troops, and as many as 5,000 civilians fled, either by boat or across land. Those attempting to cross the San Jacinto River were bottlenecked for three days, and the vicinity around the crossing transformed into a refugee camp. Burnet ordered government assistance all across Texas for fleeing families.

Battle of San Jacinto

In a troop movement that took all night on a makeshift raft, the Texian army crossed Buffalo Bayou at Lynchburg April 19 with 930 soldiers, leaving behind 255 others as guards or for reasons of illness. It was suggested that Twin Sisters be left behind as protection, but Neill was adamant that the cannons be taken into the battle. In an April 20 skirmish, Neill was severely wounded, and George Hockley took command of the heavy artillery. Estimates of the Mexican army troop strength on the day of the main battle range from 1,250 to 1,500.

The Texians attacked in the afternoon of April 21 while Santa Anna was still under the misconception that Houston was actually retreating. He had allowed his army time to relax and feed their horses, while he took a nap. When he was awakened by the attack, he immediately fled on horseback but was later captured when Sergeant James Austin Sylvester found him hiding in the grass. Houston's own account was that the battle lasted "about eighteen minutes", before apprehending prisoners and confiscating armaments. When the Twin Sisters went up against the Mexican army's Golden Standard cannon, they performed so well that Hockley's unit was able to capture the Mexican cannon.

Aftermath 
The Yellowstone saw war service for the Republic one more time on May 7, when it transported Houston and his prisoner Santa Anna, along with the government Santa Anna tried to extinguish, to Galveston Island. From there, the government and Santa Anna traveled to Velasco for the signing of treaties. Houston had suffered a serious wound to his foot during the battle and on May 28 boarded the schooner Flora for medical treatment in New Orleans.

Not until news of the victory at San Jacinto spread did the refugees return to their homesteads and businesses, or whatever was left after the destruction caused by both armies. Throughout Texas, possessions had been abandoned and later looted. Businesses, homes and farms were wiped out by the devastation of war. Often there was nothing left to go back to, but those who went home began to pick up their lives and move forward. San Felipe de Austin never really recovered from its total destruction. The few people who returned there moved elsewhere, sooner or later. Secretary of War Rusk later commended the women of Texas who held their families together during the flight, while their men volunteered to fight: "The men of Texas deserve much credit, but more was due the women. Armed men facing a foe could not but be brave; but the women, with their little children around them, without means of defense or power to resist, faced danger and death with unflinching courage."

See also

Timeline of the Texas Revolution

Notes

Footnotes

Citations

References

Further reading

External links
 Sonofthesouth.net: The Runaway Scrape

Mexican Texas
Republic of Texas
Texas Revolution
1836 in the Republic of Texas
1837 in the Republic of Texas
Sam Houston
Wars fought in Texas
Conflicts in 1836
Conflicts in 1837
1830s in Texas